The reading clerk of the United States House of Representatives reads bills, motions, and other papers before the House and keeps track of changes to legislation made on the floor.  During the vote for Speaker at the beginning of each Congress, or when the electronic voting system fails, the clerk calls the roll of members for a recorded vote.

Traditionally, the reading clerks are appointed by the leaders of the majority and minority parties. For instance, Paul Hays was appointed by the then-Minority Leader Robert H. Michel, for the Republican party. Beyond this procedure for appointment, the party status has no significance. 

Reading clerks work for the Office of Legislative Operations, one of nine offices that fall under the jurisdiction of the clerk of the U.S. House of Representatives.

List

Democratic

Republican

References

External links 
 Brief snippet about the role on the House's official site
 CSPAN'S "Capitol Questions" regarding the role

Employees of the United States House of Representatives